Christopher D. Horton (born December 29, 1984) is a former American football safety and coach who is the special teams coordinator for the Baltimore Ravens of the National Football League (NFL). He was drafted by the Washington Redskins in the seventh round of the 2008 NFL Draft. He played college football at UCLA.

Early years
He graduated in 2003 from De La Salle High School in New Orleans where he was a teammate of Marquise Hill.

Professional playing career

Washington Redskins
Horton was drafted by the Washington Redskins in the seventh round (249th overall) of the 2008 NFL Draft.  He officially signed a three-year, $1.191 million contract with the team on June 12, 2008.  The contract included a $36,000 signing bonus.

Making his first NFL start for the Redskins in Week 2 against the New Orleans Saints, Horton recovered a fumble and recorded two interceptions helping lead the team to a comeback victory.  He was named NFC Defensive Player of the Week for his efforts against the Saints.  In the week 4 game against the Dallas Cowboys, he recorded his third interception of the season.  On October 2, he was named NFL Defensive Rookie of the Month.  For week 4 he was named Diet Pepsi NFL Rookie of the Week.  As a rookie, he finished third among rookies in interceptions behind the Tampa Bay Buccaneers Aqib Talib and Arizona Cardinals Dominique Rodgers-Cromartie.

Following the 2008 season, he was awarded $342,197 in additional pay from the NFL's performance-based pay system, which gives financial compensation based on a comparison of playing time to salary; this made him the third biggest beneficiary in 2008.

Horton was released by the Redskins on September 3, 2011, just before the start of the 2011 season.

New York Giants
Horton signed with the New York Giants on March 15, 2012. He was released on August 27, 2012.

Professional coaching career

Baltimore Ravens
Horton originally joined the Baltimore Ravens as part of their coaching internship program. In 2015, the Ravens officially hired him as an assistant special teams coach.

On March 15, 2019, it was announced Horton would be promoted to special teams coordinator after Jerry Rosburg announced his retirement from coaching.

References

External links
Baltimore Ravens coaching bio
UCLA Bruins football bio

1984 births
Living people
Players of American football from Los Angeles
Coaches of American football from California
Players of American football from New Orleans
Coaches of American football from Louisiana
Sports coaches from Los Angeles
Sportspeople from New Orleans
American football safeties
UCLA Bruins football players
Washington Redskins players
New York Giants players
Baltimore Ravens coaches